The Department of Agrarian Reform (abbreviated as DAR or KRP) is an executive department of the Philippine government responsible for the redistribution of agrarian land in the Philippines.

List of the Secretaries of the Department of Agrarian Reform

Bureaus
 Bureau of Agrarian Reform Legal Assistance
 Bureau of Agrarian Reform Beneficiaries Development
 Bureau of Land Tenure Improvement
 Bureau of Land Development
 Bureau of Agrarian Reform Information Education

References

External links
 Department of Agrarian Reform website
 DAR – History

 
1971 establishments in the Philippines
Philippines, Agrarian Reform
Philippines, Agrarian Reform
Agrarian Reform